Gerónima Cruz Montoya (Potsunu) (September 22, 1915 – January 2, 2015) was an Ohkay Owingeh Pueblo artist and educator from New Mexico. She taught Native American artists at the Studio at the Santa Fe Indian School.

Early life and education
Her parents were Pablo Cruz and Crucita Trujillo, both of Ohkay Owingeh, New Mexico, where she was born.  Her Pueblo name is "Potsunu", meaning "shell", and it is with this name that she signs her work.  Her mother was a well-respected potter, and it was from her that Montoya learned the basics.  She then studied at the Santa Fe Indian School with Dorothy Dunn, from which she graduated as the valedictorian in her class in 1935, and at Claremont College.

Career
Montoya taught painting at the Santa Fe Indian School from 1937 until 1961. While Dorothy Dunn was known for developing the Studio program at the Indian School, 1932–37, Montoya was the first Native American to teach painting there for over 24 years. One of the students at the School during her time there was Tonita Peña's son Joe Herrera.

Death and legacy
For her work as both teacher and painter, Montoya was awarded the 1994 Art and Cultural Achievement Award by the National Museum of the American Indian. In 1963 Montoya started an art education program at Ohkay Owingeh and in 1968 she founded the Oke'Oweege Artistic Cooperative there. Montoya died on January 2, 2015, at the age of 99.

Further reading
 Jeanne Shutes and Jill Mellick, The Worlds of P'otsunu: Geronima Cruz Montoya of San Juan Pueblo, Albuquerque: University of New Mexico Press, 1996. .

References

1915 births
2015 deaths
20th-century American painters
American women painters
Painters from New Mexico
Pueblo artists
Native American artists
People from Rio Arriba County, New Mexico
20th-century American women artists
Native American women artists
20th-century Native Americans
21st-century Native Americans
20th-century Native American women
21st-century Native American women